The 2022 Princess Auto Players' Championship was held April 12–17 at the Mattamy Athletic Centre in Toronto, Ontario. It was the fourth Grand Slam and final major of the 2021–22 curling season, following the cancellation of the Meridian Open.

Despite feeling ill in the final due to food poisoning, Anna Hasselborg led her team to their seventh Grand Slam title, and completed a career Grand Slam, becoming the first women's team to do so.

Qualification
The top 16 ranked men's and women's teams on the World Curling Federation's world team rankings qualified for the event. In the event that a team declines their invitation, the next-ranked team on the world team ranking is invited until the field is complete.

Men
Top world team ranking men's teams:
 Brad Gushue
 Bruce Mouat
 Kevin Koe
 Niklas Edin
 Brad Jacobs
 Glenn Howard
 Matt Dunstone
 Colton Flasch
 Brendan Bottcher
 Jason Gunnlaugson
 Mike McEwen
 Ross Whyte
 Steffen Walstad
 Yannick Schwaller
 Marco Hösli
 Peter de Cruz
 Joël Retornaz
 John Epping

Women
Top world team ranking women's teams:
 Eve Muirhead
 Tracy Fleury
 Anna Hasselborg
 Satsuki Fujisawa
 Jennifer Jones
 Silvana Tirinzoni
 Kerri Einarson
 Kim Eun-jung
 Tabitha Peterson
 Laura Walker
 Chelsea Carey
 Rachel Homan
 Mackenzie Zacharias
 Alina Kovaleva
 Krista McCarville
 Gim Eun-ji
 Daniela Jentsch
 Hollie Duncan
 Isabella Wranå

Men

Teams

The teams are listed as follows:

Knockout brackets

Source:

A event

B event

C event

Knockout results

All draw times are listed in Eastern Time (UTC−04:00).

Draw 3
Tuesday, April 12, 3:00 pm

Draw 4
Tuesday, April 12, 6:30 pm

Draw 7
Wednesday, April 13, 4:00 pm

Draw 8
Wednesday, April 13, 8:00 pm

Draw 9
Thursday, April 14, 8:30 am

Draw 10
Thursday, April 14, 12:00 pm

Draw 11
Thursday, April 14, 4:00 pm

Draw 12
Thursday, April 14, 8:00 pm

Draw 13

Friday, April 15, 8:30 am

Draw 15
Friday, April 15, 4:00 pm

Draw 17
Saturday, April 16, 8:30 am

Playoffs

Quarterfinals
Saturday, April 16, 4:00 pm

Semifinals
Saturday, April 16, 8:00 pm

Final
Sunday, April 17, 4:00 pm

Women

Teams

The teams are listed as follows:

Knockout brackets

Source:

A event

B event

C event

Knockout results

All draw times are listed in Eastern Time (UTC−04:00).

Draw 1
Tuesday, April 12, 8:00 am

Draw 2
Tuesday, April 12, 11:30 am

Draw 5
Wednesday, April 13, 8:30 am

Draw 6
Wednesday, April 13, 12:00 pm

Draw 9
Thursday, April 14, 8:30 am

Draw 10
Thursday, April 14, 12:00 pm

Draw 11
Thursday, April 14, 4:00 pm

Draw 12
Thursday, April 14, 8:00 pm

Draw 13
Friday, April 15, 8:30 am

Draw 14

Friday, April 15, 12:00 pm

Draw 16

Friday, April 15, 8:00 pm

Playoffs

Quarterfinals
Saturday, April 16, 12:00 pm

Semifinals
Saturday, April 16, 8:00 pm

Final
Sunday, April 17, 12:00 pm

Notes

References

External links

April 2022 sports events in Canada
2022 in Canadian curling
Curling in Toronto
Sports competitions in Toronto
2022 in Toronto
Players' Championship